Bratislava–Dunajská Streda–Komárno railway line runs near Danube in the South-western part of Slovakia, in Žitný ostrov. Since 4 March 2012 it is operated by RegioJet.

External links 

 Home page of RegioJet
 Timetable
 Data of the railway line – Vlaky.net 
 Pictures about the stations – Vasútállomások.hu

Railway lines in Slovakia